Kenneth Kim Young (born November 15, 1995) is an American football linebacker who is a free agent. He played college football at UCLA, and was drafted by the Baltimore Ravens in the fourth round of the 2018 NFL Draft. He has also previously played for the Los Angeles Rams and Denver Broncos.

Professional career

Baltimore Ravens
Young attended UCLA and played college football there. He was eventually drafted by the Baltimore Ravens in the fourth round with the 122nd overall pick in the 2018 NFL Draft. In his first NFL start in the Ravens' season opener against the Buffalo Bills, Young recorded his first career sack to go along with four total tackles. He finished his rookie season with 51 combined tackles, 2.5 sacks, and a forced fumble.

Los Angeles Rams
On October 15, 2019, Young was traded to the Los Angeles Rams, along with an undisclosed draft pick, in exchange for cornerback Marcus Peters. 

In Week 14 of the 2020 season against the New England Patriots, Young led the team with eight tackles, sacked Cam Newton once, and intercepted a pass thrown by Newton that he returned for a 79-yard touchdown during the 24–3 win.  This was Young's first career touchdown.

Denver Broncos
On October 25, 2021, Young was traded to the Denver Broncos for a 2024 sixth-round pick.

Las Vegas Raiders
On May 9, 2022, Young was signed by the Las Vegas Raiders. He was released on August 18.

Tampa Bay Buccaneers
On September 5, 2022, Young was signed to the Tampa Bay Buccaneers practice squad. He was promoted to the active roster on September 21, 2022. He was released on October 10.

New Orleans Saints
On November 10, 2022, Young was signed to the New Orleans Saints practice squad. He was released on December 20.

References

External links
UCLA Bruins bio
Baltimore Ravens bio

1995 births
Living people
American football linebackers
Baltimore Ravens players
Denver Broncos players
Las Vegas Raiders players
Los Angeles Rams players
New Orleans Saints players
Players of American football from New Orleans
Tampa Bay Buccaneers players
UCLA Bruins football players